Ronnie P. Barnes (born February 15, 1952) is an American football athletic trainer who is the head athletic trainer for the New York Giants of the National Football League (NFL). He is also their senior vice president of medical services, and has been with the organization since 1976. He graduated from East Carolina University in 1975, and was the first African-American head athletic trainer in the NFL.

Early life and education
Ronnie Barnes was born on February 15, 1952, in North Carolina. He attended East Carolina University and graduated in 1975. He was an assistant athletic trainer for the football team in 1975 after his graduation. He later went to Michigan State University to get a master's degree.

Professional career
In 1976, Barnes became an athletic training intern for the New York Giants. He was promoted to a trainer in 1980 and to head athletic trainer in 1981. He won the National Professional Athletic Trainer of the Year award in 1983 and 1987. Barnes was named to the ECU Athletics Hall of Fame in 1990 and the National Athletics Trainers Association Hall of Fame in 1999. Barnes won Super Bowls XXI, XXV, XLII, and XLVI with the Giants. He was given a lifetime achievement award in 2019. He was inducted into the Giants Ring of Honor in 2022.

Awards
ECU Athletics Hall of Fame (1990)
National Athletic Trainers Association Hall of Fame (1999)
4x Super Bowl champion
Lifetime Achievement Award
2x National Professional Athletic Trainer of the Year (1983, 1987)
New York Giants Ring of Honor (2022)

References

Further reading

External links
Ronnie Barnes: The Tom Brady of Athletic Trainers | NFL Films Presents
Inside the Legacy of Ronnie Barnes | NY Giants Senior VP of Medical Services/Head Athletic Trainer
Combating COVID-19: Giants’ MVP, Ronnie Barnes
NEW JERSEY Q & A: RONNIE BARNES; Keeping the Giants Players Healthy

1952 births
Living people
New York Giants coaches
New York Giants personnel
Coaches of American football from North Carolina
Athletic trainers